Christopher Stadler (born 7 January 1994) is an Austrian football player. He plays for ASK-BSC Bruck/Leith.

Club career
He made his Austrian Football First League debut for SC Wiener Neustadt on 5 May 2017 in a game against SV Horn.

References

External links
 

1994 births
Living people
Austrian footballers
Austrian expatriate footballers
SC Wiener Neustadt players
TSV Hartberg players
2. Liga (Austria) players
Austrian Regionalliga players
Association football goalkeepers
Austrian expatriate sportspeople in Germany
Expatriate footballers in Germany